Thomas G. Andrews is an American historian.

Life
He graduated from Yale University, and University of Wisconsin–Madison with a Ph.D. in U.S. History, May 2003.
He teaches at University of Colorado, Boulder.

Awards
 2009 Bancroft Prize
 2009 George Perkins Marsh Prize for Best Book in Environmental History 
 U. S. Environmental Protection Agency grant
 Huntington Library grant
 National Endowment for the Humanities grant
 American Council of Learned Societies grant

Works
"The Road to Ludlow: Work, Environment, and Industrialization in Southern Colorado, 1869-1914", Rockefeller Archive Center

References

External links

"Killing for Coal: An Interview with Thomas G. Andrews", Popmatters, 30 January 2009, Emily F. Popek

 University of Wisconsin–Madison College of Letters and Science alumni
University of Colorado faculty
Living people
21st-century American historians
21st-century American male writers
Year of birth missing (living people)
Bancroft Prize winners
Yale University alumni
American male non-fiction writers